Richard Upton (born 1975) is an Australian retired swimmer who won three medals in the 4 × 100 m freestyle relay at the World Championships in 1995, 1997, and 1998.

In 1998, he was suspended from competitions for three months and lost $8,200 in fines and cancelled funding after a positive test for probenecid. The drug was prescribed to him by a doctor against the flu, but can also be used to mask steroids.

References

1975 births
Living people
Australian male freestyle swimmers
World Aquatics Championships medalists in swimming
Medalists at the FINA World Swimming Championships (25 m)
Universiade medalists in swimming
Universiade gold medalists for Australia